Ioanna Karystiani (Greek. Ιωάννα Καρυστιάνη; (born 8 September 1952 in Chania, Crete) is a Greek screenwriter and winner of the Greek National Book Award.

Biography
Ioanna Karystiani was born in 1952 in Chania in Crete in a family from Asia Minor. She took up Law Studies and worked as a cartoonist for several media, among them the Greek communist newspaper Rizospastis (Greek Ριζοσπάστης) and the magazines Tetarto, Ena and Eikones. She has also worked as a scriptwriter and made a name for herself among the Greek film industry.

She lives in Athens and in the Greek island of Andros and is married to the Greek film director Pantelis Voulgaris. They have two children. They have worked together in films such as Nyfes, Psyhi Vathia and
To Teleftaio Simeioma.

Ioanna Karystiani has had success with her short stories book I kyria Kataki (Mrs Kataki) and her novel Mikra Anglia (Little England, published in English as The Jasmine Island) in which she describes the romances, lives and work of a family in the sailor community of the island of Andros in the first half of the twentieth century. The novel achieved the Greek National Award for Literature and was also made into the 2013 film Little England.

References

http://d-nb.info/gnd/122927664
http://www.europaeditions.com/author.php?Id=15
http://www.literaturfestival.com/bios1_3_6_316.html

External links

1952 births
Greek screenwriters
Greek women writers
Living people
Women screenwriters